Alexander Franklin James (January 10, 1843 – February 18, 1915) was a Confederate soldier and guerrilla; in the post-Civil War period, he was an outlaw. The older brother of outlaw Jesse James, Frank was also part of the James–Younger Gang.

Childhood
James was born in Kearney, Missouri, to Baptist minister Reverend Robert Sallee James and his wife Zerelda (Cole) James. The couple came from Kentucky.  He was of English, Welsh and Scottish descent. Frank was the oldest of three children. His father died in 1851 and his mother remarried Benjamin Simms in 1852. After his death, she married a third time to Dr. Reuben Samuel in 1855, when Frank was 13 years old. As a child, James showed interest in his late father's sizable library, especially the works of William Shakespeare. Census records show that James attended school regularly, and he reportedly wanted to become a teacher.

Civil War

The American Civil War began in 1861, when James was eighteen years old. The secessionists in Missouri, including Governor Claiborne Fox Jackson, attempted to drive the Union army out of the state, but were eventually defeated. The James family was from the heavily Confederate western portion of the state. On September 13, 1861, the Missouri State Guard, including private Frank James, besieged Lexington, Missouri. James fell ill and was left behind when the Confederate forces retreated. He surrendered to the Union troops, was paroled, and was allowed to return home. On his arrival, however, he was arrested by the local pro-Union militia and was forced to sign an oath of allegiance to the Union.

After the withdrawal of regular Confederate troops in the fall of 1861, a bitter guerrilla conflict soon began between bands of pro-Confederate irregulars (commonly known as bushwhackers) and the Union homeguards. By early 1863, Frank, ignoring his parole and oath of allegiance, had joined the guerrilla band of Fernando Scott, a former saddler. He soon switched to the more active command led by William Clarke Quantrill.

Union militiamen searching for Fernando Scott raided the Samuel farm and hanged Dr. Reuben Samuel (though not fatally), Frank's stepfather, torturing him to reveal the location of the guerrillas. Shortly afterward, Frank took part with Quantrill's company in the August 21, 1863 Lawrence Massacre where approximately 200 mostly unarmed civilians were killed.

 in Nelson County, Kentucky. There is a report that after his parole, Frank was involved in a gunfight in Brandenburg, Kentucky with four soldiers that resulted in two soldiers killed, one wounded, and Frank wounded in the hip.

Outlaw/criminal years and retirement

During his years as a bandit, James was involved in at least four robberies between 1868 and 1876 that resulted in the deaths of bank employees or citizens. The most famous incident was the disastrous Northfield, Minnesota, raid on September 7, 1876, that ended with the death or capture of most of the gang.

Five months after the killing of his brother Jesse in 1882, Frank James boarded a train to Jefferson City, Missouri, where he had an appointment with the governor in the state capitol. Placing his holster in Governor Crittenden's hands, he explained,

Accounts say that James surrendered with the understanding that he would not be extradited to Northfield, Minnesota.

He was tried for only two of the robberies/murders: one in Gallatin, Missouri, for the July 15, 1881, robbery of the Rock Island Line train at Winston, Missouri, in which the train engineer and a passenger were killed, and the other in Huntsville, Alabama, for the March 11, 1881, robbery of a United States Army Corps of Engineers payroll at Muscle Shoals, Alabama. Among others, former Confederate General Joseph Orville Shelby testified on James's behalf in the Missouri trial. He was acquitted in both Missouri and Alabama. Missouri accepted legal jurisdiction over him for other charges, but they never came to trial. He was never extradited to Minnesota for his connection with the Northfield Raid.

His New York Times obituary summarized his arrest and acquittal:

In the last thirty years of his life, James worked a variety of jobs, including as a shoe salesman in Nevada, Missouri and then as a burlesque theater ticket taker in St. Louis.  One of the theater's spins to attract patrons was their use of the phrase "Come get your ticket punched by the legendary Frank James." He also served as an AT&T telegraph operator in St. Joseph, Missouri. James took up the lecture circuit, while residing in Sherman, Texas. In 1902, former Missourian Sam Hildreth, a leading thoroughbred horse trainer and owner, hired James as the betting commissioner at the Fair Grounds Race Track, in New Orleans. He returned to the North Texas area where he was a shoe salesman at Sanger Brothers in Dallas. The  Tacoma Times reported in July, 1914, that he was picking berries at a local ranch in Washington state, and planned to buy a farm nearby. He was also part of a Chicago investment group which purchased the Fletcher Terrell's Buckskin Bill's Wild West Show, third in size after the Buffalo Bill and Pawnee Bill shows.

In his final years, James returned to the James Farm, giving tours for the sum of 25 cents.  He died there at age 72 on February 18, 1915. He left behind his wife Annie Ralston James and one son. He is interred in Hill Park Cemetery, in the western portion of Independence, Missouri.

Portrayals

 1939, Henry Fonda in the film Jesse James as well as the 1940 sequel The Return of Frank James.
 1941, Al Taylor in Jesse James at Bay.
 1946, Tom Tyler in the film Badman's Territory
 1949, Tom Tyler in I Shot Jesse James, an account from Robert Ford's viewpoint, and the first western directed by Samuel Fuller.
 1950, Richard Long in Kansas Raiders, about his time spent with Quantrill's Raiders.
 1954, Richard Travis in Stories of the Century.
 1957, Jeffrey Hunter in  The True Story of Jesse James.
 1959, Jim Davis in Alias Jesse James
 1960, Robert Dix in Young Jesse James.
 1965–66, Allen Case in The Legend of Jesse James.
 1972, John Pierce in The Great Northfield Minnesota Raid.
 1977, John Bennett Perry in an episode of Little House on the Prairie.
 1980, Stacy Keach in The Long Riders, which featured four sets of real brothers playing sets of brothers in the gang.
 1980, country singer Johnny Cash in the concept album, The Legend of Jesse James.
 1984, Nick Benedict in an episode of The Dukes of Hazzard.
 1986, country singer Johnny Cash in The Last Days of Frank and Jesse James, directed by William A. Graham.
 1992, Jamie Walters in the American Western TV show, The Young Riders.
 1994, Bill Paxton in Frank & Jesse.
 1995, Leonard Nimoy in the made-for-TV movie Bonanza: Under Attack.
 2001, Gabriel Macht in American Outlaws.
 2007, Sam Shepard in The Assassination of Jesse James by the Coward Robert Ford
 2010, James Brolin in True Grit
 2018, Robert Carradine in Bill Tilghman and the Outlaws.

References

Further reading

Copland, Aaron and Perlis, Vivian: Copland - 1900 Through 1942, St. Martin's/Marek, 1984.
Settle, William A., Jr.: Jesse James Was His Name, or, Fact and Fiction Concerning the Careers of the Notorious James Brothers of Missouri, University of Nebraska Press, 1977
Yeatman, Ted P.: Frank and Jesse James: The Story Behind the Legend, Cumberland House, 2001
Stiles, T.J.: Jesse James: Last Rebel of the Civil War, Alfred A. Knopf, 2002
Wellman, Paul I. A Dynasty of Western Outlaws. 1961; 1986.

External links

Official website for the Family of Frank & Jesse James: Stray Leaves, A James Family in America Since 1650
John Koblas, author of several Jesse James books
A short profile of the James brothers
Biographical information for the James Family
The James brothers' familiar connection to other notorious outlaws
An examination of the James Legend
Summary of the Battle of Wilson's Creek where Frank fought
Summary of the Battle of Lexington where Frank fought
A history of Missouri during the Civil War
A site devoted to the Missouri Partisan Rangers and their history
A description of the raid at Lawrence, Kansas

1843 births
1915 deaths
People from Kearney, Missouri
American people of English descent
American people of Scottish descent
American people of Welsh descent
People of Missouri in the American Civil War
Outlaws of the American Old West
American bank robbers
Confederate States Army soldiers
Bushwhackers
James–Younger Gang
Missouri State Guard
American folklore
Gunslingers of the American Old West
Train robbers
19th-century American criminals